GLAAD, an acronym of Gay & Lesbian Alliance Against Defamation, is an American non-governmental media monitoring organization. Originally founded as a protest against defamatory coverage of gay and lesbian demographics and their portrayals in the media and entertainment industries, it has since included bisexual and transgender people.

History
Formed in New York City in 1985 to protest against what it saw as the New York Posts defamatory and sensationalized AIDS coverage, GLAAD put pressure on media organizations to end what it saw as homophobic reporting. Initial meetings were held in the homes of several New York City activists as well as after-hours at the New York State Council on the Arts. The first reported meeting occurred on November 14, 1985. The founding group included film scholar Vito Russo; Gregory Kolovakos, then on the staff of the NYS Arts Council and who later became the first executive director; Darryl Yates Rist; Allen Barnett; and Jewelle Gomez, the organization's first treasurer.

In 1987, after a meeting with GLAAD, The New York Times changed its editorial policy to use the word "gay" instead of harsher terms referring to homosexuality. GLAAD advocated that the Associated Press and other television and print news sources follow. GLAAD's influence soon spread to Los Angeles, where organizers began working with the entertainment industry to change the way the gay and lesbian community were portrayed on screen.

Entertainment Weekly has named GLAAD as one of Hollywood's most powerful entities, and the Los Angeles Times described GLAAD as "possibly one of the most successful organizations lobbying the media for inclusion".

Within the first five years of its founding in New York as the Gay and Lesbian Anti-Defamation League (soon after changed to "Gay & Lesbian Alliance Against Defamation" after legal pressure by the Anti-Defamation League), GLAAD chapters had been established in Los Angeles and other cities, with the LA chapter becoming particularly influential due to its proximity to the California entertainment industry. GLAAD/NY and GLAAD/LA would eventually vote to merge in 1994, with other city chapters joining soon afterward; however, the chapters continue to exist, with the ceremonies of the GLAAD Media Awards being divided each year into three ceremonies held in New York City, Los Angeles and San Francisco.

Following the 2011 resignation of Jarrett Barrios from the GLAAD presidency, Mike Thompson served as interim president until the announcement of Herndon Graddick, previously GLAAD's Vice-President of Programs and Communications, to the presidency on April 15, 2012. Graddick is the younger son of Charles Graddick of Mobile, a circuit court judge and the former Attorney General of Alabama.

In 2013, Jennifer Finney Boylan was chosen as the first openly transgender co-chair of GLAAD's National Board of Directors.

Name change
On March 24, 2013, GLAAD announced that it had formally dropped the "Gay & Lesbian Alliance Against Defamation" from their name and would now be known only as GLAAD to reflect their work more accurately; the name change was a commitment to incorporate bisexual and transgender people in their efforts to support the LGBTQ+ community in its entirety.

Executives
Sarah Kate Ellis is the current president and CEO of GLAAD. Ellis took reign in 2014 and under her leadership GLAAD's revenue grew by 38%. In 2015, Ellis hired Nick Adams as director of the transgender media program.

GLAAD/NY Executive Directors (1985–1994)
 Gregory Kolovakos (1985–1987)
 Craig Davidson (1987–1990)
 Ellen Carton (1991–1995)

GLAAD Early Board Members/Officers
 Christopher Borden Paine (1985–?)
 Amy Bauer (1986–?)

GLAAD/LA  Executive Directors (pre-1994)
 Richard Jennings and Jehan Agrama (1989–1992)
 Peter M. Nardi (1992–1993)
 Lee Werbel (1993–1994)

Post-merger (1994–present)
 William Waybourn (as national managing director; 1995 – 1997)
 Joan M. Garry (1997 – June 2005)
 Neil Giuliano (September 2005 – June 2009)
 J. Michael Durnil (interim; June – September 2009)
 Jarrett Barrios (September 2009 – June 2011)
 Mike Thompson (acting) (June 2011 – 2012)
 Herndon Graddick (April 2012 – May 2013)
 Dave Montez (May 2013 – November 2013)
 Sarah Kate Ellis (2013 – present)

Other executives
 Scott Seomin
 John Sonego

Programs

GLAAD Media Awards

The GLAAD Media Awards were established in 1989. Ceremonies are held annually in New York City, Los Angeles and San Francisco.

Announcing Equality Project
Established in 2002, GLAAD's Announcing Equality project has resulted in more than 1,000 newspapers including gay and lesbian announcements alongside other wedding listings.

Commentator Accountability Project
In March 2012, GLAAD launched the Commentator Accountability Project, which seeks to index and document frequent contributors, guests and pundits who regularly express anti-LGBT bias and misinformation in their contributions to journalism outlets.

Studio Responsibility Index
In August 2013, GLAAD launched its first annual Studio Responsibility Index, which indexes "the quantity, quality and diversity of images of LGBT people in films released by six major motion picture studios".

GLAAD Media Reference Guide
The GLAAD Media Reference Guide is a style guide of recommendations for writers, especially journalistic outlets, to reference in positive, inclusive depiction of LGBT people. It has been published since the 1990s (then known as the GLAAD Media Guide to the Lesbian and Gay Community), with the 11th edition, being the most recent, published in 2022.

Social Media Safety Index
The 2021 GLAAD Social Media Safety Index, based on an analysis of Facebook, Instagram, TikTok, Twitter and YouTube, assessed that social media was "effectively unsafe for LGBTQ users."

Movements
GLAAD has begun the Together Movement, which encourages all to join in support of those discriminated against including women, Muslims, immigrants and members of the LGBTQ+ community.

In 2010, GLAAD launched Spirit Day. Spirit Day is an annual national day of action to show LGBTQ youth that they are not alone.

In 2016, Spirit Day was the world's largest and most visible anti-bullying campaign. The campaign works to bring anti-bullying resources to classrooms all around the world by inspiring educators to take action against bullying through hosting events and rallies. The campaign also created a GLAAD's Spirit Day kit for use in classrooms, which is available in 6 languages.

On social media, people are encouraged to wear purple or go purple online in order to stand united against bullying. Large media companies such as NBC Universal and Viacom show support for Spirit Day on the airwaves, and change their on-air logo to purple for the day. They also enlist people who wear purple during the day's broadcast. The hashtag #Spirit Day has become a trending topic on Twitter and Facebook every year. On social media, people such as Oprah Winfrey, Ellen DeGeneres and President Barack Obama have shown their support for the campaign.

Media consultation
GLAAD has at times worked with companies and studios in a consultative role to help with the depiction of LGBT characters and themes in specific projects. In 2004, Fox provided GLAAD with an advance copy of their reality television special Seriously, Dude, I'm Gay for review. Upon review of the special, GLAAD condemned it as "an exercise in systematic humiliation." The special was shelved only hours before a scheduled meeting between GLAAD and Fox entertainment president Gail Berman to discuss the network's on-air depictions of gay men. Ray Giuliani, an executive producer of Seriously, Dude, I'm Gay, largely attributed the special's cancellation to pressures that Fox faced from GLAAD. Following the cancellation of the special, Fox organized another meeting with GLAAD for discussion over how to improve their on-air representations of the LGBT community. Following the cancellation of Seriously, Dude, I'm Gay the executive producers of the TBS series He's a Lady consulted GLAAD for review of the transgender representation in their own program. 

The crossover fighting game Street Fighter X Tekken, developed by Japanese video game developer and publisher Capcom, was released in 2012. The game features Poison, who is a transgender woman, as a playable character. Capcom worked closely with GLAAD on the game's script to ensure they do not "alienate anybody" in regard to Poison's representation, and "anything that might be offensive has been very tailored to not be".

Tell Me Why is an episodic narrative adventure game developed by French studio Dontnod Entertainment and published by Xbox Game Studios in 2020. The game focuses on twin siblings Alyson and Tyler Ronan, who is a transgender man. Tell Me Why was the first Triple-A game to feature a transgender protagonist. GLAAD helped in creating Tyler's character, with the game's director Florent Guillaume described GLAAD as "invaluable" in developing Tyler's character and making him a "realistic hero". GLAAD's director of transgender representation Nick Adams served as consultant who, amongst other areas, helped ensure that Tyler would be played by a trans actor; August Black. Adams described authentic representations of trans people in media as a "powerful tool for acceptance and understanding".

The third season of Young Justice consulted GLAAD on the subject of representing minority characters and narratives.

See also

 All About Trans
 List of LGBT rights organizations
 Trans Media Watch
 Violence against LGBT people

References

External links
 

1985 establishments in New York City
Anti-bullying organizations in the United States
Anti-homophobia
LGBT political advocacy groups in the United States
LGBT portrayals in mass media
Mass media monitoring
Organizations based in Los Angeles
Organizations based in New York City
Organizations established in 1985